Jennifer Tiexiera is an American documentary filmmaker. She is known for directing the films P.S. Burn This Letter Please and Subject.

Career
Tiexiera's editorial debut feature documentary, I Trust You to Kill Me, was originally broadcast on Sky One in 2006. She was nominated for Sports Emmy Awards in 2012, for her work on The Marinovich Project. She edited and produced VR documentaries ZIKR: A Sufi Revival and The Day the World Changed. She is a member of the International Documentary Association and Film Fatales.

In 2019, Tiexiera wrote, edited and produced, 17 Blocks, for which she won best editing at the Tribeca Festival. In 2020, she co-directed the feature documentary, P.S. Burn This Letter Please, along with Michael Seligman, which won the audience award at Outfest. In 2022, she co-directed Subject, along with Camilla Hall, which premiered and was nominated for best documentary at the Tribeca Film Festival.

Selected filmography

As Editor

 2022 – Sirens
 2022 – Mija
 2021 – All These Sons
 2020 – P.S. Burn This Letter Please
 2019 – 17 Blocks
 2018 – Afghan Cycles
 2018 – The Day the World Changed
 2017 – Biggie: The Life of Notorious B.I.G.
 2017 – A Suitable Girl
 2017 – Believer with Reza Aslan

 2015 – Salam Neighbor
 2014 – Road to Paloma
 2013 – Eyewitness War
 2012 – Behind the Music
 2012 – The Marinovich Project
 2011 – Off Limits
 2011 – Dragonslayer
 2008-2009 – Cities of the Underworld
 2007 – Destination Truth
 2006 – I Trust You to Kill Me

References

External links
 
 

American documentary film directors
American documentary film producers
English film editors
Living people
Year of birth missing (living people)
Date of birth missing (living people)
Film directors from Los Angeles
People from Los Angeles